Dryabloye is a rural locality (a village) in Pokrovskoye Rural Settlement, Vashkinsky District, Vologda Oblast, Russia. The population was 50 as of 2002.

Geography 
Dryabloye is located 71 km northwest of Lipin Bor (the district's administrative centre) by road. Nikolskoye is the nearest rural locality.

References 

Rural localities in Vashkinsky District